Jellycream is the second studio album by the blues/rock guitarist Doyle Bramhall II. It was originally released in the US on September 14, 1999. The album is produced under the label RCA Records.

"I Wanna Be" and "Marry You" were re-recorded by Eric Clapton for Riding With The King, his first collaborative effort with B.B. King, which won the 2000 Grammy Award for Best Traditional Blues Album and was certified double platinum in the United States.

Track listing
 "I Wanna Be" (Bramhall, Charlie Sexton) -         (3:50)
 "Day Come Down" (Bramhall, Chris Bruce, Susannah Melvoin) -       (3:57)
 "Marry You"(Bramhall, Craig Ross, Susannah Melvoin) - (4:21)
 "Snakecharmer" (Bramhall, Susannah Melvoin) -        (4:28)
 "Who I Am" (Bramhall, Bruce) -            (3:46)
 "Away We Go Away" (Bramhall, Lisa Coleman, Wendy Melvoin) -     (4:18)
 "Close To Heaven" (Bramhall, Bruce) -    (4:24)
 "I'm The One" (Bramhall, Coleman, Wendy Melvoin, Susannah Melvoin) -         (3:30)
 "Baby's Gone" (Bramhall, Bruce) -         (4:02)
 "I'm Leavin'" (Bramhall, Bruce, Susannah Melvoin) -         (4:54)
 "Chasin' The Sun" (Bramhall, Ross) -     (4:15)
 "I Will Remember" (Bramhall, Sexton, Susannah Melvoin) -     (4:25)
 "Chariot" (Bramhall, Susannah Melvoin) -             (3:24)

Personnel
Susannah Melvoin - Percussion
Wendy Melvoin - Bass, Guitar, Percussion
Jamie Muhoberac - Keyboards
Charley Drayton - Percussion, Drums
Christopher McCants - Photography
Jeri Heiden - Artwork, Design, Art Direction
Doyle Bramhall II - Guitar, Percussion, Vocals, Drums
John Heiden - Artwork, Art Direction, Design
Chris Bruce - Bass Guitar, Background Vocals, Keyboards
Lisa Coleman - Organ, Piano, Wurlitzer, Keyboards, Percussion
C. Ross - Guitar, Pump Organ 
Tchad Blake - Percussion, Photography, Mixing, Producer, Engineer
Mitchell Froom - Keyboards, Clavinet
Lou Perez - Still Pictures
Charlie Sexton - Bass, Guitar, Tack Piano

Album review

References

External links
Artistsdirect.com

1999 albums
Doyle Bramhall II albums
Albums produced by Tchad Blake
RCA Records albums